United Nations Security Council resolution 605, adopted on 22 December 1987, after hearing from a representative from South Yemen and recalling the Geneva Conventions and Security Council resolutions 446 (1979), 465 (1980), 497 (1981) and 592 (1986), the Council condemned Israel for violating the human rights of the Palestinian people and in particular the opening of fire and killing of students in the first few weeks of the First Intifada.

The resolution called upon Israel to desist from its policies in the occupied territories and to respect the Fourth Geneva Convention, urging maximum restraint to contribute towards the establishment of peace in the region. It also stressed the urgent need to reach a just, durable and peaceful settlement of the Arab–Israeli conflict as a whole.

The resolution requested the Secretary-General to examine the present situation and recommend ways for ensuring the safety and protection of the Palestinian civilians under occupation and to report back no later than 20 January 1988.

Text of the resolution

Votes
The resolution was adopted by 14 votes to none against, with one abstention from the United States, which did so due to its "generalised criticism of Israeli policies and practices" while ignoring Arab provocations which led to the incident.

See also
United Nations Security Council Resolution 607
 Arab–Israeli conflict
 First Intifada
 Israeli–Palestinian conflict
 List of United Nations Security Council Resolutions 601 to 700 (1987–1991)

External links
Text of the Resolution at undocs.org

References

 0605
 0605
Israeli–Palestinian conflict and the United Nations
December 1987 events